Hurry Up Mode is a remix album by Buck-Tick, released on February 2, 1990. It is composed of different versions of every song on their 1987 debut album Hurry Up Mode, except the two CD-exclusive bonus tracks. It reached number one on the Oricon chart, selling 212,430 copies.  The album was digitally remastered and re-released on February 19, 2002, with two different bonus tracks. It was remastered and re-released again on September 5, 2007. "Moon Light" was later re-recorded once again for their 1992 compilation album Koroshi no Shirabe This Is Not Greatest Hits.

Track listing 
All songs written & composed by Hisashi Imai, except track 2 music & track 9 lyrics by Atsushi Sakurai.
 "Prologue"
 "Plastic Syndrome Type II"
 ""Hurry Up Mode"
 "Telephone Murder"
 "Fly High"
 "One Night Ballet"
 "Moon Light"
 "For Dangerous Kids"
 "Romanesque"
 "Secret Reaction"
 "Stay Gold"

2002 Digital Remaster Bonus Tracks 
 "Moon Light" (Unreleased Version)
 "Theme of BT" (by Naka Nozomu)

References 

Buck-Tick albums
Victor Entertainment remix albums
1990 remix albums